Renascença ("renascence") is a bairro in the District of Sede in the municipality of Santa Maria, in the Brazilian state of Rio Grande do Sul. It is located in west Santa Maria.

Villages 
The bairro contains the following villages: Condomínio Residencial Arco Verde, Renascença, Vila Renascença.

References 

Bairros of Santa Maria, Rio Grande do Sul